Liberty Row is a national historic district located at Fayetteville, Cumberland County, North Carolina.  It encompasses 14 contributing buildings and 1 contributing site in the central business district of Fayetteville.  The district includes consists of a block of 14 brick row buildings dating between 1791 and 1916. The Liberty Point Store is the oldest structure and is a two-story, five bay, Federal style brick building.

It was listed on the National Register of Historic Places in 1973. It is incorporated into the Fayetteville Downtown Historic District.

References

External links

Historic American Buildings Survey in North Carolina
Commercial buildings on the National Register of Historic Places in North Carolina
Historic districts on the National Register of Historic Places in North Carolina
Federal architecture in North Carolina
Italianate architecture in North Carolina
Romanesque Revival architecture in North Carolina
Buildings and structures in Fayetteville, North Carolina
National Register of Historic Places in Cumberland County, North Carolina